Ibrahim Iyad Abdou Issimaila (born 11 January 1987 in Marseille, France), known as Iyad Issimaila, is a former professional footballer who played as a midfielder. Born in France, he represented the Comoros national team internationally, earning two caps.

References

External links
 
 

Living people
1987 births
French footballers
Citizens of Comoros through descent
Comorian footballers
Footballers from Marseille
Comoros international footballers
French sportspeople of Comorian descent
Association football midfielders